Doğtaş is a Turkish furniture industry with a wide range of products from seating groups to dining room furniture, child and teenager room furniture, bedroom furniture, the first Medical Grade CE-certified mattresses in Turkey, and unique designs developed at international quality standards. 

It was founded in Biga, Çanakkale, in 1972.

One of the most well-established industrial organizations in the history of the Republic, Kelebek Mobilya was founded to manufacture plywood for aircraft wings in 1935. It manufactured plywood with Kelebek brand in Haliç, Istanbul, until 1986. It opened the modular furniture factory built in Düzce in technical cooperation with the world's best project groups in 1978 as one of Europe's most modern and largest manufacturing plants. Kelebek Mobilya continues to manufacture special wooden components for furniture, kitchen, bathroom, and living room sets using advanced technology in 40,000 square meters of indoor area on a 186,000-square meter plot in Düzce.

Doğtaş bolstered its already strong position in the furniture industry by acquiring Kelebek Mobilya in 2006. Following the merger, Doğtaş operated as Kelebek Furniture, Kelebek Kitchen & Bathroom, and Lova brands, and with the department of project works under the name Doğtaş Kelebek Mobilya San. ve Tic. A.Ş.

References

External links
Doğtaş Kelebek

1935 establishments in Turkey
Companies of Turkey